Donnement is a commune in the Aube department in north-central France. The main road passing through the town is the D56.

Population

See also
 Communes of the Aube department

References

Communes of Aube